Choi Won-jae (Hangul: 최원재, born October 26, 1993), better known by his stage name Kid Milli (Hangul: 키드밀리), is a South Korean rapper. He released his first extended play, Maiden Voyage, on February 23, 2017.

Biography 
Before becoming a rapper, Kid Milli was a StarCraft pro-gamer.

He took rap lessons from Swings.

He participated in Show Me the Money Season 777 and finished as a second runner up.

He was a mentor on High School Rapper Season 3.

He was also a mentor in Show me the Money Season 8.

Discography

Studio albums

Extended plays

Charted singles

References

1993 births
Living people
South Korean male rappers
South Korean hip hop singers
21st-century South Korean  male singers